C.D. Guadalajara Femenil is a Mexican professional women's football club based in Zapopan, Jalisco, Mexico that competes in the Liga MX Femenil. The club has been the women's section of C.D. Guadalajara since 2017.  Nicknames for the team are Chivas and the Rebaño Sagrado, the same as the men's team. The team play its home matches at Estadio Akron.

C.D. Guadalajara Femenil is one of only four clubs that have been able to win the Liga MX Femenil title, winning the league title on two occasions.

History

Professional era, the beginning 
C.D. Guadalajara Femenil was founded on 5 December 2016, the same day that Liga MX Femenil was announced by the FMF. Luis Camacho was appointed as the first manager of Chivas femenil on 3 January 2017. Previous to the first season of Liga MX Femenil, Chivas participated in their first official tournament, the 2017 Copa MX Femenil, a tournament that was created to prepare all the Liga MX Femenil teams for the first season of the league.

Chivas femenil played its first league match in history against city rivals Atlas on 29 July 2017 in front of a crowd of around 1,000 persons. The match was the first instance of the Clásico Tapatío in Liga MX Femenil, and ended in a 3–0 victory in favor of Chivas, with Anette Vázquez scoring Chivas first league goal in history.

First League Title 
It didn't took long for Chivas Femenil to win its first league title as the team was able to win the first league tournament, the Apertura 2017. In this Apertura 2017 tournament, Chivas ended the regular phase of the tournament on the second place of its group behind Tigres with 34 pts and fourth in the general standings. In the Liguilla, Chivas faced Club América, in the first instance of the Clasico Nacional in Liga MX Femenil.  Chivas ended up winning the semifinal against America with a resounding 6–2 aggregate score. In the final, Chivas faced Pachuca who were the winner of the 2017 Copa MX Femenil.  On the first leg of the Final at Estadio Hidalgo, Pachuca came out victorius with a favorable 2–0 scoreline. Nonetheless, Chivas would endup crowning themselves league champions by defeating Pachuca 3–0 on the second leg at Estadio Chivas (now Estadio Akron), in front of a 32,466 persons.

2018 to Present 
Although Chivas ended in fourth place in the general standings of the Clausura 2018 tournament with 29 pts, it was unable to qualify to the playoffs due to ending the regular phase in the third place of its respective group. Due to the performance of the team during the Clausura 2018, the club decided to dismiss manager Luis Camacho on 29 December 2018. On the same day, the club also appointed Luis Manuel Díaz as the new manager of Chivas Femenil.

Players

Current squad
As of 16 July 2021

Out on loan

Personnel

Club Administration

Management staff

Managerial history

Seasons

Records

Most goals

Most appearances

Honors and awards

Club
Guadalajara
 Liga MX Femenil
 Winners (2): Apertura 2017, Clausura 2022
 Campeón de Campeones 
 Winners (1): 2022

Notes

References

External links
 

 
Football clubs in Guadalajara, Jalisco
Guadalajara
 
Association football clubs established in 2017
Women's association football clubs in Mexico
2017 establishments in Mexico